Hilden is a Canadian rural community located in Colchester County, Nova Scotia.

Demographics
The population of Hilden is approximately 1,200 and the community is located in Colchester Census Division C.  The majority of the population live in three middle class residential subdivisions and the community functions as a suburb of the town of Truro.

Education
The first school in what became Hilden was a single-room building opened in 1870. This burnt in 1914, and a new building was erected on the same site the following year.
After education reforms in Nova Scotia in the 1940s, students from Hilden attended a new elementary school until their 5th year, and thence were transported to Brookfield for instruction.

A modern Hilden Elementary School was constructed in 1986 and currently serves students from Primary to Grade 6. Students then attend South Colchester Academy in Brookfield.

Recreation
Hilden residents usually travel to Truro or Brookfield for most recreational activities. However, the United Church in the community  allows non-religious groups to use the church hall for numerous activities, such as weekly yoga classes, kick boxing, belly dancing classes, and fundraising activities. The Hilden Volunteer Fire Brigade's building also serves as a community center for receptions and sports banquets.

The Scotia Pine Campground is in the southern part of the community, and is a popular destination for weekend vacationers from around Nova Scotia.

The Hilden Garden Club meets regularly to discuss their floral interests.

Economy
Hilden is a mix of rural and suburban settlements. Most of the population commute to Truro or Halifax daily, though there are still a few farms outside of the subdivisions.
Shops and services include a medical clinic and ophthalmologist's office, a large gardening store and nursery, a small restaurant,  and an engraver, a gun repair shop, mechanic garage and Bentley Bikes.
  
Sulpher mining was carried out on a small scale until the 1970s, and timber harvesting continues today.

Politics
Hilden is located in District 3 of the Colchester Municipality, and is represented by first term(2008) Councillor Gerry Buott . 
Provincially, Hilden is in the riding of Colchester-Musquodoboit Valley and is represented by the Member of the Legislative Assembly Gary Burrill of the New Democratic Party.
The community falls in the federal riding of Cumberland-Colchester-Musquodoboit Valley and is represented by Member of Parliament Scott Armstrong of the Conservative Party of Canada.

History
The land which is now the unincorporated community was originally part of the Truro Township, settled by New England Planters in the 1780s.

At the time that the Intercolonial Railway began operation in December, 1858 the settlement was called "Halifax Road." A railway station was built, and about that time a meeting was called to name the settlement. "Clarksville" was suggested in honour of an old family in the area. The majority, however, decided on "Johnsons Crossing" in honour of a man who had his farm on the base line road which crossed the Halifax road at the railway.

By 1870, "Clarkesville" was used to refer to the western hill's settlement, and "Johnsons Crossing" to the eastern hill. By an act of the Nova Scotia House of Assembly in 1895, the name of the communities, along with "Slabtown" further south, was changed to Hilden.

Communities in Colchester County